Clivina banksi is a species of ground beetle in the subfamily Scaritinae. It was described by Sloane in 1907.

References

banksi
Beetles described in 1907